...In Dub is a dub remix album by Meat Beat Manifesto. ...In Dub is mostly remixes of RUOK? material with select songs featuring vocals by DJ Collage; however, there are some original tracks. The album was issued as both a CD and a DVD which contains minimalistic music videos. Both versions also have separate track listings.

Track listing

CD version
"Introduction Dub" – 1:30
"Echo in Space Dub" – 4:26
"Spinning Round Dub" – 5:32
"Fromage Dub" – 5:50
"Intermission Dub" – 4:07
"Super Soul Dub" – 5:26
Drums, Percussion, Songwriter: Lynn Farmer
"Caramel Dub" – 4:26
"Happiness Supreme Dub" – 4:44
"Retrograde Dub" – 5:22
"Timebomb Dub" – 3:24
"Radiation Dub" – 7:28
"Retrograde Pt. 2 Dub We R 1" – 4:59

DVD version
"Introduction Dub"
"Echo In Space Dub"
Vocals: DJ Collage
"Spinning Round Dub"
"Fromage Dub"
Vocals: DJ Collage
"Intermission Dub"
"Super Soul Dub"
Featuring: Lynn Farmer
Vocals: DJ Collage
"Caramel Dub"
"Happiness Supreme Dub"
"Retrograde Dub"
Vocals: DJ Collage
"Radiation Dub"
"This Is A Test"
"Deep Field Recording #3"

References

Meat Beat Manifesto remix albums
Music video compilation albums
1999 video albums
1999 remix albums
1999 compilation albums
Meat Beat Manifesto compilation albums
Meat Beat Manifesto video albums